Gregory Emmett Sims  (born June 28, 1946) is an American former professional baseball player. During his nine-season (1965–1973) playing career, he spent part of one season, as a member of the Houston Astros of Major League Baseball.

Career
Sims had originally signed with the Pittsburgh Pirates and was selected by Houston after his first professional season in the Rule 5 draft. He made his Major League debut on April 15, 1965, as a defensive replacement for Astro left fielder Lee Maye, struck out in his only plate appearance, and recorded one putout in the field. Sims then made six other appearances as a pinch hitter before being sent to the Class A Durham Bulls of the Carolina League. In his penultimate MLB game, on May 14 at Connie Mack Stadium, Sims collected his only big-league hit, a single off Terry Fox in the 11th inning that helped to spark a three-run game-winning rally over the Philadelphia Phillies.

References

External links
, or Retrosheet, or Pura Pelota (Venezuelan Winter League)

1946 births
Living people
African-American baseball players
American expatriate baseball players in Mexico
Asheville Tourists players
Baseball players from San Francisco
Batavia Pirates players
Dallas–Fort Worth Spurs players
Denver Bears players
Durham Bulls players
Florida Instructional League Astros/Reds players
Florida Instructional League Astros/Senators players
Houston Astros players
Major League Baseball left fielders
Navegantes del Magallanes players
American expatriate baseball players in Venezuela
Oklahoma City 89ers players
Sacramento City College alumni
Sacramento City Panthers baseball players
Salem Rebels players
Savannah Senators players
Sultanes de Monterrey players
21st-century African-American people
20th-century African-American sportspeople